This article displays the squads for the 2019 World Women's Handball Championship. Each team consisted of up to 28 players, of whom 16 may be fielded for each match.

Age, club, caps and goals as of 30 November 2019.

Group A

Angola
A 19-player squad was announced on 29 October 2019.

Head coach:  Morten Soubak

Cuba
Head coach: Jorge Coll

Netherlands
An 18-player squad was announced on 4 November 2019.

Head coach:  Emmanuel Mayonnade

Norway
The squad was announced on 4 November 2019. On 11 December, Kristine Breistøl replaced Helene Gigstad Fauske in the squad.

Head coach:  Thorir Hergeirsson

Serbia
The squad was announced on 14 November 2019.

Head coach: Ljubomir Obradović

Slovenia
The squad was announced on 7 November 2019.

Head coach: Uroš Bregar

Group B

Australia
The squad was announced on 24 November 2019.

Head coach:  Heba Aly

Brazil
The squad was announced on 7 November 2019.

Head coach:  Jorge Dueñas

Denmark
The squad was announced on 18 October 2019. On 9 December, Mia Rej replaced Simone Böhme in the squad.

Head coach: Klavs Bruun Jørgensen

France
A 20-player squad was announced on 7 November 2019.

Head coach: Olivier Krumbholz

Germany
A 17-player squad was announced on 29 October 2019.

Head coach:  Henk Groener

South Korea
Head coach: Kang Jae-won

Group C

Hungary
A 28-player squad was announced on 3 November 2019. An 18-player squad was announced on 11 November 2019.

Head Coach:  Kim Rasmussen

Kazakhstan
Head coach: Berik Beknazarov

Montenegro
A 20-player squad was announced on 17 November 2019. A 17-player squad was revealed on 19 November 2019. The same day, the squad was reduced to 16 players, as it was announced that Ivona Pavićević would not participate, due to doping investigations.

Head coach:  Per Johansson

Romania
An 18-player squad was announced on 7 November 2019. A final 17-player squad was revealed on 20 November 2019.

Head coach:  Tomas Ryde

Senegal
A 20-player squad was announced on 25 October 2019.

Head coach:  Frédéric Bougeant

Spain
A 17-player squad was announced on 6 November 2019. On 19 November 2019, Maitane Etxeberria replaced Carmen Martín in the squad due to a foot injury.

Head coach: Carlos Viver

Group D

Argentina
An 18-player squad was announced on 4 November 2019.

Head coach: Eduardo Gallardo

China
Head coach:  Heine Jensen

DR Congo
Head coach: Célestin Mpoua

Japan
A 21-player squad was announced on 12 November 2019.

Head coach:  Ulrik Kirkely

Russia
A 20-player squad was announced on 8 November 2019. On 20 November the squad was reduced to 18 players.

Head coach:  Ambros Martin

Sweden
An 18-player squad was announced on 22 October 2019. On 5 November 2019, Kristin Thorleifsdóttir replaced Sabina Jacobsen in the squad due to a knee injury. On 30 November, Jessica Ryde and Kristin Thorleifsdóttir were cut from the squad. 

Head coach: Henrik Signell

Statistics

Player representation by league system
In all, World Championship squad members play for clubs in 31 different countries.

Coaches representation by country
Coaches in bold represent their own country.

References

World Handball Championship squads
2019 in women's handball